The 2008 Giro del Trentino was the 32nd edition of the Tour of the Alps cycle race and was held on 22 April to 25 April 2008. The race started in Arco and finished in Peio Terme. The race was won by Vincenzo Nibali.

General classification

References

2008
2008 in road cycling
2008 in Italian sport